Robert Hanley Hall (April 25, 1850 – December 12, 1924) was an Irish-born fur trader and political figure in British Columbia. He represented Cassiar in the Legislative Assembly of British Columbia from 1890 to 1894.

He was born in Derry, the son of Reverend Thomas Hall. Hall began his career at Fenelon Falls, Ontario. He joined the Hudson's Bay Company in British Columbia in 1872 as a clerk. Hall was stationed in the New Caledonia District, at Fort Simpson, at Victoria and at Prince Albert. He was promoted to chief factor in 1906. Hall was president of the Board of Trade in Prince Albert for three years. He married Rachel Sarah, the daughter of Peter Skene Ogden, in 1876. Hall was named fur trade commissioner for the Hudson's Bay Company at Winnipeg in 1910. He retired from the Hudson's Bay Company in 1913 and retired to Prince Albert, where he died at the age of 74.

References 

1850 births
1924 deaths
Politicians from Derry (city)
Irish emigrants to pre-Confederation Ontario
Independent MLAs in British Columbia
Hudson's Bay Company people
Canadian fur traders